The Château de la Garoupe is a château located near Garoupe Beach in Antibes, France.

History
In 1907, British MP Charles McLaren, Baron Aberconway, bought  at the point of the Cap d’Antibes. He hired English architect Ernest George to build the property. It features a long façade with half moon windows and a long stairway leading to the sea. The garden, which was maintained by his wife, Laura McLaren, Baroness Aberconway, features a pergola with  rose bushes, irises and begonias.

At times the house was rented or visited by various celebrities, including Cole Porter & Linda Porter, and Pablo Picasso.

The house passed to the McLaren's daughter Florence and her husband, Sir Henry Norman. Norman expanded the property and added an extra storey to the house.

In 1999, the home was purchased by Russian tycoon Boris Berezovsky (1946–2013) for €22 million.

See also 
List of castles in France

References

Houses completed in 1917
Châteaux in Alpes-Maritimes
20th-century architecture in France